Ullalu  is a village in the southern state of Karnataka, India. It is located in the Bangalore North taluk of Bangalore Urban district in Karnataka.  India census, Ullalu had a population of 6851 with 3539 males and 3312 females.

References

External links
 http://Bangaloreurban.nic.in/

Villages in Bangalore Urban district